Henry B. Longhurst (February 1891 in Brighton, Sussex – 11 April 1970 in Reading, Berkshire) was a British actor.

Selected filmography

 Chin Chin Chinaman (1931) - Purser
 The Crooked Lady (1932) - John Morland
 When London Sleeps (1932) - Inspector Bradley
 Let Me Explain, Dear (1932) - Dr. Coote
 A Safe Proposition (1932) - Sergeant Crouch
 My Lucky Star (1933) - Dudley Collins 
 Letting in the Sunshine (1933) - (uncredited)
 Dangerous Ground (1934) - Inspector Hurley 
 Over the Garden Wall (1934) - Minor role (uncredited)
 Blossom Time (1934) - Minor role (uncredited)
 Menace (1934) - (uncredited)
 Murder at Monte Carlo (1935) - Editor
 Abdul the Damned (1935) - General of the Bodyguards 
 Bulldog Jack (1935) - Melvor (uncredited)
 The Vandergilt Diamond Mystery (1936) - Inspector Greig
 Under Proof (1936) - Inspector Holt
 Sweeney Todd: The Demon Barber of Fleet Street (1936) - Man On The Quayside Who Talks To Sweeney Todd (uncredited)
 The Avenging Hand (1936) - Streeter
 Jack of All Trades (1936) - Party Guest (uncredited)
 For Valour (1937) - Inspector Harding
 Crackerjack (1938) - Insp. Lunt 
 Old Mother Riley, MP (1939) - Henry Wicker
 Sailors Don't Care (1940) - Adm. Drake
 Gasbags (1941) - Woodcutter (uncredited)
 Old Mother Riley's Ghosts (1941) 
 Let the People Sing (1942)
 A Place of One's Own (1945) - Inspector 
 Perfect Strangers (1945) - Petty Officer 
 Old Mother Riley at Home (1945) - Commissionaire
 The Long Dark Hall (1951) - Judge 
 Lady Godiva Rides Again (1951) - Soap director
 His Excellency (1952) - Lord Kynaston
 Time Gentlemen, Please! (1952) - PC Tumball 
 Circumstantial Evidence (1952) - Bolton 
 The Captain's Paradise (1953) - Prof. Killick
 The Red Beret (1953) - Minor Role (uncredited)
 Eight O'Clock Walk (1954) - Clerk of Court (uncredited)
 Diplomatic Passport (1954) - Jonathan (uncredited)
 The Belles of St. Trinian's (1954) - Doctor (uncredited)
 Mad About Men (1954) - Mayor (uncredited)
 The Quatermass Xperiment (1955) - George - Maggie's Father (uncredited)
 Touch and Go (1955) - Mr. Pritchett 
 Private's Progress (1956) - Mr. Spottiswood
 Keep It Clean (1956) - Magistrate
 Brothers in Law (1957) - Rev. Arthur Thursby
 Lucky Jim (1957) - Professor Hutchinson
 Gideon's Day (1958) - Reverend Courtney, the vicar 
 A Touch of Larceny (1960) - Club Member
 A French Mistress (1960) - Second Governor
 The Night We Got the Bird (1961) - Vicar
 Heavens Above! (1963) - Deaf Gentleman
 Murder Ahoy! (1964) - Cecil Ffolly Hardwicke (uncredited)
 Young Cassidy (1965) - Doctor
 Circus of Fear (1966) - Henry, Hotel Porter

References

External links
 

1891 births
1970 deaths
English male film actors
Male actors from Brighton
20th-century English male actors